ENAP may refer to:

 École nationale d'administration publique, school of public administration in Quebec, Canada
 Empresa Nacional del Petróleo, Chilean oil company
 Escuela Nacional de Artes Plásticas, art school of the National Autonomous University of Mexico
 Escuela Nacional de Artes Plásticas "Rafael Rodríguez Padilla", art school in Guatemala City, Guatemala